was a Japanese rower. While a student at Keio University, he joined a crew called Dragon Club, and later competed in the men's coxed four event at the 1932 Summer Olympics as a member of the Keiō Crew, a reorganized and strengthened version of Jison-kai crew from the same university.

References

1911 births
1995 deaths
Japanese male rowers
Olympic rowers of Japan
Rowers at the 1932 Summer Olympics
Place of birth missing